Milan Ivkošić (born 23 July 1947) is a Croatian journalist writing for Večernji list.

He was born in a Catholic family in the village of Zmijavci near Imotski. Ivkošić started his journalist career in the 1970s as a journalist of the youth newspaper Tlo. He worked as a writer and editor, and in 1981 he became a columnist for the magazine Start. This was followed by radio and television columns. He was an editor for Večernji list, where he still writes commentary. Ivkošić is a conservative journalist, and writes mainly about political subjects for Večernji list.

References

External links
Milan Ivkošić o svom pozivu 
"MEDIA ATTACK BY MILAN IVKOSIC AGAINST CROATIA FEMINISTS", Women War Memory

People from Imotski
Croatian journalists
Croatian columnists
1947 births
Living people